Philip William Ray (1806 – 23 January 1880) was an English cricketer with amateur status. He was associated with Cambridge University and made his first-class debut in 1827. He was educated at Bury St Edmunds Grammar School and Clare College, Cambridge. He became a Church of England priest and was rector of Greensted from 1837 until his death.

References

1806 births
1880 deaths
English cricketers
English cricketers of 1826 to 1863
Cambridge University cricketers
People educated at King Edward VI School, Bury St Edmunds
Alumni of Clare College, Cambridge
19th-century English Anglican priests